Heraclitus of Halicarnassus (3rd century BC) was an elegiac poet of the Hellenistic period.

Heraclitus was a Carian, a native of Halicarnassus, a Greek city on the south-west coast of Anatolia. He was a contemporary and friend of Callimachus of Cyrene, who wrote a memorial epigram on him which is preserved in Diogenes Laërtius. Only one poem by Heraclitus himself – an epigram on a mother who died in childbirth giving birth to twins – is extant in the Greek Anthology.

References

Bibliography 

 "Heracleitus (3)", William Smith (ed.) Dictionary of Greek and Roman Biography and Mythology. 3. Boston: Little, Brown & Co., 1867.
 The Greek Anthology II (Loeb Classical Library) translated by W. R. Paton. London: Heinemann; New York: G. P. Putnam's Sons, 1916.

Epigrammatists of the Greek Anthology
3rd-century BC Greek people
Ancient Halicarnassians